Nghĩa Hưng is a rural district of Nam Định province in the Red River Delta region of Vietnam. As of 2003 the district had a population of 202,231. The district covers an area of 250 km2. The district capital lies at Liễu Đề.

Subdivisions

Nghia Hung is administratively divided into 25 subdivisions: 
 3 townships (thị trấn): Liễu Đề (district capital), Rạng Đông and Qũy Nhất. 
 21 communes (xã): Nghĩa Đồng, Nghĩa Thịnh, Nghĩa Minh, Hoàng Nam, Nghĩa Châu, Nghĩa Thái, Nghĩa Trung, Nghĩa Sơn, Nghĩa Lạc, Nghĩa Hồng, Nghĩa Phong, Nghĩa Phú, Nghĩa Bình, Nghĩa Tân, Nghĩa Thành, Nghĩa Lâm, Nghĩa Hùng, Nghĩa Hải, Phúc Thắng, Nghĩa Lợi and Nam Điền.

References

Districts of Nam Định province